Simone Perilli (born 7 January 1995) is an Italian professional footballer who plays as a goalkeeper for Serie A club Hellas Verona.

Club career
Born in Rome, Perilli started his career at Lazio, before joining city rivals Roma. He then moved to Sassuolo in January 2012, as he proceeded to feature for their youth teams from 2012 to 2014. 

On 2 August 2014, Perilli was signed by Lega Pro club Pro Patria on a season-long loan.

On 5 July 2015 Perilli received a call-up from Sassuolo. However, on 14 July he joined the pre-season camp of Reggiana instead. The transfer paperwork was completed on 28 July. He signed a three-year contract.

On 3 July 2018, Perugia announced that they had signed Perilli on loan from Pordenone, with an option to buy.

On 13 August 2019, he signed with Pisa.

On 1 July 2021, Perilli joined Brescia. On 29 July 2022, hiss contract with Brescia was terminated by mutual consent.

On 3 August 2022, Perilli joined Serie A side Hellas Verona on a free transfer, signing a two-year deal. On 5 March 2023, he made his top-tier debut in a league match against Spezia, following an influenza infection occurring to first-choice keeper Lorenzo Montipò: in the process, he helped his side keep a clean sheet in a goalless draw.

References

External links
 

Italian footballers
A.S. Roma players
U.S. Sassuolo Calcio players
Aurora Pro Patria 1919 players
A.C. Reggiana 1919 players
A.C. Perugia Calcio players
Pisa S.C. players
Brescia Calcio players
Hellas Verona F.C. players
Serie B players
Serie C players
Italy youth international footballers
Association football goalkeepers
Footballers from Rome
1995 births
Living people